Dong Yu is a Chinese gymnast. She won a gold medal in the Women's trampoline event at the 2010 Summer Youth Olympics.

References

Living people
Chinese female artistic gymnasts
Gymnasts at the 2010 Summer Youth Olympics
Year of birth missing (living people)
Youth Olympic gold medalists for China
21st-century Chinese women